Flesh and Bone may refer to:

 Flesh and Bone (film), a 1993 film starring Meg Ryan, Dennis Quaid and James Caan
 Flesh and Bone (miniseries), a 2015 American television series on Starz
 "Flesh and Bone" (Battlestar Galactica), an episode of the 2004 TV series Battlestar Galactica
 Flesh and Bone (Lucy Kaplansky album), 1996
 Flesh and Bone (Richard Marx album), 1997
 "Flesh and Bone", a song by Matt Maher from the album Alive Again
 "Flesh and Bone", a song by The Killers from the album Battle Born
 "Flesh and Bone", a song by Alien Ant Farm from the album ANThology
 "Flesh and Bone", a song by Marion Raven from the album Nevermore
 "Flesh & Bone", a song by Plan B from the album Heaven Before All Hell Breaks Loose
 "Flesh and Bone", a song from the 2020 Disney Channel movie "Zombies 2"
 Flesh and Bone, a young adult novel by Jonathan Maberry

See also
 Flesh-n-Bone (born 1973), member of the rap group Bone Thugs-n-Harmony